The men's 200 metre ind. medley SM6 event at the 2012 Paralympic Games took place on 3 September, at the London Aquatics Centre.

Two heats were held, eight swimmers swam in each. The swimmers with the eight fastest times advanced to the final.

Heats

Heat 1

Heat 2

Final

References

Swimming at the 2012 Summer Paralympics